Leendert de Koningh (12 April 1777, Dordrecht – 8 June 1849, Dordrecht), was a Dutch marine and landscape painter
De Koningh was instructed by A. Vermeulen and M. Versteeg, and in 1801 came to England, but in 1803 was compelled to leave that country on account of the War of the Third Coalition. He then went to Paris, and studied under David. Thence he returned home by way of Germany. In 1816, he paid a second visit to England, but he basically spent the rest of his life in his hometown.

References

Attribution:
 

1777 births
1849 deaths
Dutch landscape painters
Dutch marine artists
Artists from Dordrecht
Pupils of Jacques-Louis David
19th-century Dutch painters
Dutch male painters